Kakan is an uninhabited island in Croatia, adjacent to Kaprije.

References

Uninhabited islands of Croatia
Islands of the Adriatic Sea